Agnières is a commune in the Pas-de-Calais department in northern France.

Geography
A small farming village located 10 miles (16 km) northwest of Arras, by the banks of the river Scarpe, at the D49 and D75E road junction.

Population

Sights
 The church of St.Leger, dating from the twelfth century.

See also
Communes of the Pas-de-Calais department

References

Communes of Pas-de-Calais